Licania grandibracteata is a species of plant in the family Chrysobalanaceae. It is endemic to Ecuador.  Its natural habitat is subtropical or tropical moist montane forests.

References

Endemic flora of Ecuador
grandibracteata
Vulnerable plants
Taxonomy articles created by Polbot
Taxobox binomials not recognized by IUCN